Exoudun is a commune in the Deux-Sèvres department in the Nouvelle-Aquitaine region in western France.

History 
During the Middle Ages, Lordship of Exoudun was held in succession by several noble families, including the Lusignans. Lord of Exoudun was titled: Seigneur d′Exoudun.

See also
 Communes of the Deux-Sèvres department
 Raoul I of Exoudun
 Raoul II of Exoudun

References

Sources 

 
 

Communes of Deux-Sèvres